Birkenwerder is a municipality in the Oberhavel district, in Brandenburg, Germany.

Geography 
Birkenwerder is situated in the south of Oberhavel. The northern border of Berlin is 3 kilometres away. Birkenwerder shares his border with Oranienburg in the north, Mühlenbecker Land in the east and Hohen Neuendorf in the south and in the north. In the centre of Birkenwerder is the river Briese. In the west of Birkenwerder it empties in the River Havel. Briese and Lindenhof are districts of Birkenwerder. More than 50% of the area consists of forest. There are many forest roads, also along the river Briese. Birkenwerder is connected to the motorway A 10 (Bundesautobahn 10), the B 96 (Bundesstraße 96) and the B 96a which ends in the centre of Birkenwerder.

Demography

References 

Localities in Oberhavel